Limonium solanderi is a species of sea lavender commonly known as native sea lavender. It is native to the Australia, where it is known to inhabit salt marshes and estuaries along the eastern coast from Brisbane to Townsville in Queensland.
It has small yellow flowers 

The plant was originally collected by Sir Joseph Banks. His specimens are still held by the British Museum

References

External links
Online Field Guide to Common Saltmarsh Plants of Queensland

solanderi
Flora of Queensland